Scherwenzel or Scharwenzel is an historical, south German, gambling game played with cards and named after the Unters or Jacks that had special privileges. It should not be confused with the north German card game of Scharwenzel, which is a relative of German Solo and in which the Jacks are permanent top trumps, below the black Queens and the trump 7.

Origin of the name 
The word Wenzel was a short form in German of the male first name Wenzeslaus which is Wenceslas or Wenceslaus in English. For reasons that are not entirely clear a Scherwenzel was originally a pejorative name for an  obsequious servant or lackey.

Card game 
As a card game, Scherwenzel appears to have been a form of Färbeln played especially in Bavaria in which the Unters were variously known as Scharwenzels, Scherwenzels, Scherers or Wenzels. They, and to some extent also the Nines, functioned as wildcards. According to Adelung, Grobhäusern was "far simpler than Scherwenzeln". In a 1711 French-German dictionary, it is recorded that a tricon is a triplet in the game of Scherwenzel. 
This variant should not be confused with the north German game of Scharwenzel, in which the Jacks have no special role, but the top trumps, like those in Hombre and Solo are the black Queens and the trump 7.

Scherwenzel is recorded as early as 1563 as scherlentzen in a list of card games by Marstaller.

As the name of a card, probably an Unter, the German-suited equivalent of a Jack, Scherwenzel is mentioned in a 1700 play by Christian Weise, thus implying it was in common usage by then. Another early record which may hint at the eponymous game occurs in a 1722 natural history book by Johann Friedrich Henkel where he likens 3 Principiis to "the two Scherwenzels (pity there aren't three) which can be turned into any suit in the pack". Another reference to the Scherwenzels as wildcards, able to be converted into any card in the pack, occurs in a 1726 book on medicine.

The game of Scherwenzel was popular enough in the early 18th century that it was used, at least in Bavaria, pars pro toto to refer to any game at cards.

A 1744 German rendering of Alexander Pope's Rape of the Lock translates the game of Lu as Scherwenzel. Scherwenzel also features in a list of games in a 1755 poem. 

Although no rules are known, Scherwenzel appears to be a variant of Grobhäusern in which the Jacks function as wildcards, called Wenzels or Scherwen(t)zels. The 9s are secondary wenzels. There is some indication that Scherwenzel, and possibly also Grobhäusern, could also be played with 5 cards.

References

Literature 
 _ (1756). Die Kunst die Welt erlaubt mitzunehmen in den verschiedenen Arten der Spiele, Volume 2, Georg Bauer, Nuremberg.
 Grimm, Jacob and Wilhelm Grimm (1893). Deutsches Wörterbuch. Vol. 8 (R–Schiefe). Leipzig: S. Hirzel.
 Marstaller, Christoph (1563). Der Welt Urlaub von den Menschen Kindern.
 Rondeau, Pierre (1711). Nouveau Dictionnaire françois-allemand et allemand-françois, Volume 1. Leipzig: Fritschen.
 Schmeller, Johann Andreas (1836). Bayerisches Wörterbuch. Part 3 (R and S). Stuttgart and Tübingen: J.G. Cotta.

18th-century card games
German card games
Multiplayer games
French deck card games